Anurag Sharma (born 16 November 1964) is a Bharatiya Janata Party politician and Member of Parliament in Lok Sabha from Jhansi-Lalitpur constituency of Uttar Pradesh.

References

India MPs 2019–present
Lok Sabha members from Uttar Pradesh
Living people
Bharatiya Janata Party politicians from Uttar Pradesh
Politicians from Jhansi
Bundelkhand University alumni
1964 births